The 2019–20 season is Pakistan Army's 69th season of competitive football, 68th season in the top division of Pakistani football and 12th season in the Pakistan Premier League since it was first created. In addition to the Pakistan Premier League, the club competed in the National Challenge Cup.

During this season, Pakistan Army won National Challenge Cup for the third, winning their first since 2001.

Competitions

Overview

{| class="wikitable" style="text-align: center"
|-
!rowspan=2|Competition
!colspan=8|Record
|-
!
!
!
!
!
!
!
!
|-
| National Challenge Cup

|-
! Total

National Challenge Cup
Pakistan Army were drawn in Group C of the National Challenge Cup alongside Pakistan Railways, PFF Tigers and Civil Aviation Authority.

Group stages

Quarter-finals

Semi-finals

Final

Squad information

First team squad

Statistics

Squad statistics

Appearances (Apps.) numbers are for appearances in competitive games only including sub appearances
Red card numbers denote:   Numbers in parentheses represent red cards overturned for wrongful dismissal.

Goalscorers

Includes all competitive matches. The list is sorted alphabetically by surname when total goals are equal.

Clean sheets

The list is sorted by shirt number when total clean sheets are equal. Numbers in parentheses represent games where both goalkeepers participated and both kept a clean sheet; the number in parentheses is awarded to the goalkeeper who was substituted on, whilst a full clean sheet is awarded to the goalkeeper who was on the field at the start of play.

References

2019–20 in Pakistani football